Zvezdan Čebinac (Serbian Cyrillic: Звeздaн Чeбинaц; 8 December 1939, Belgrade – 18 February 2012, Aarau) was a Serbian football midfielder and manager. He played 20 times for SFR Yugoslavia. He had then a coaching career in Switzerland.

He was the twin brother of Srđan Čebinac. With Partizan he won three Yugoslav Championships (1961, 1962, 1963).

References

1939 births
2012 deaths
Serbian footballers
Yugoslav footballers
Yugoslavia international footballers
Association football midfielders
Yugoslav First League players
FK Partizan players
Red Star Belgrade footballers
Eredivisie players
PSV Eindhoven players
Bundesliga players
1. FC Nürnberg players
Hannover 96 players
Yugoslav expatriate footballers
Serbian expatriate footballers
Expatriate footballers in the Netherlands
Expatriate footballers in West Germany
Expatriate footballers in Switzerland
Yugoslav football managers
Serbian football managers
Serbian twins
FC Aarau managers
Twin sportspeople
FC Wohlen managers
Yugoslav expatriate sportspeople in West Germany
Yugoslav expatriate sportspeople in the Netherlands
Yugoslav expatriate sportspeople in Switzerland
Expatriate football managers in Switzerland